Akeem Stewart (born 4 July 1992) is a Trinidad and Tobago Paralympic athlete competing in F43/F44-classification discus throw, javelin throw and shot put events.

He represented Trinidad and Tobago at the 2016 Summer Paralympics in Rio de Janeiro, Brazil where he won the gold medal in the men's javelin throw F44 event and the silver medal in the men's discus throw F44 event.

Career

In 2011, he competed at the CARIFTA Games held in Montego Bay, Jamaica where he won two medals in the junior under-20 events: the silver medal in the discus throw event and the bronze medal in the shot put event. He competed at the 2013 Central American and Caribbean Championships in Athletics held in Morelia, Mexico where he finished in 4th place in the shot put event.

In 2014, he finished in 4th place in the shot put event at the 2014 Central American and Caribbean Games held in Veracruz, Mexico. In this year he also competed in the 2014 NACAC U23 Championships in Athletics where he won the bronze medal in the shot put event. The following year, he represented Trinidad and Tobago at the 2015 Parapan American Games and he won two gold medals: in the men's discus throw F44 event and in the men's javelin throw F44 event. In the same year, he also competed in the 2015 World Championships and he won the bronze medal in the men's discus throw F44 event.

In 2017, he competed in the 2017 World Championships winning the gold medal in both the shot put F44 and javelin throw F44 events. He also set a new world record in both events. In 2018, he represented Trinidad and Tobago at the 2018 Commonwealth Games held in Gold Coast, Australia and he did not win a medal on this occasion. He competed in the men's shot put event where he finished in 9th place in the final. In 2019, he won the gold medal in the men's discus throw F64 event at the 2019 Parapan American Games held in Lima, Peru. He also set a new world record of 63.70m He also won the silver medal in the men's javelin throw F64 event.

Achievements

References

External links

 

Living people
1992 births
Place of birth missing (living people)
Paralympic athletes of Trinidad and Tobago
Paralympic gold medalists for Trinidad and Tobago
Paralympic silver medalists for Trinidad and Tobago
Competitors at the 2014 Central American and Caribbean Games
Athletes (track and field) at the 2016 Summer Paralympics
Athletes (track and field) at the 2018 Commonwealth Games
Medalists at the 2016 Summer Paralympics
Trinidad and Tobago male javelin throwers
Trinidad and Tobago male discus throwers
Trinidad and Tobago male shot putters
Paralympic medalists in athletics (track and field)
Commonwealth Games competitors for Trinidad and Tobago
Medalists at the 2015 Parapan American Games
Medalists at the 2019 Parapan American Games